Michael Fox (born Myron Melvin Fox, February 27, 1921 – June 1, 1996) was an American character actor who appeared in numerous films and television shows. Some of his most famous recurring roles were as various autopsy physicians in Perry Mason, as Coroner George McLeod in Burke's Law, as Amos Fedders in Falcon Crest, and as Saul Feinberg in The Bold and the Beautiful.

Early life

Fox was born in Yonkers, New York to Jacob Fox, an Austrian-born salesman, and his wife, the former Josephine Berkowitz.  He was the youngest of four children, and the third son.

Career

Michael Fox began acting in stage plays in southern California circa 1945.  Through his stage endeavors, Fox met Harry Sauber who introduced him to Sam Katzman.

Two of his regular TV roles were as the coroner in the courtroom drama Perry Mason, and as Saul Feinberg on the CBS soap opera The Bold and the Beautiful from 1989 to 1996.

Among his earlier television work was the penultimate episode of Adventures of Superman, as the ringleader of a criminal gang that tried to conduct a Perils of Pauline–style series of murder attempts on the show's various protagonists.  He also appeared in several episodes on the 1955–1957 television series Science Fiction Theatre.

The Dr. Fox effect

Fox also made an important contribution to the scholarly field of education, as the actor who portrayed "Dr. Myron L. Fox" in a study that would give rise to the Dr. Fox effect, and also participated in the generation of additional materials in at least one follow-up study.  In the initial demonstration of this effect, Fox delivered an engaging and expressive lecture that contained no meaningful content, and yet, the audience rated Fox just as highly as a genuine professor's lecture.  The Dr. Fox effect has been often cited as a critique of the validity of student evaluations of teaching.

Personal life and death

He was married to Hannah, an actress he met while acting in the stage play The Dybbuk, in a Los Angeles area theatre run by Lou Smuckler, father-in-law of Lee J. Cobb.   Borrowing a car from Dorothy Gish, Fox drove Hannah to a judge and married her between the matinee and evening performances of The Story of Mary Surratt.

Fox died of pneumonia June 1, 1996, in Woodland Hills, Los Angeles, California. His death was written into The Bold and the Beautiful.

Acting roles

Non-recurring or recurring multiple roles in television series

Science Fiction Theatre
Beyond (1955) - Radar Man
The Brain of John Emerson (1955) - Dr. Franklin
The Frozen Sound (1955) - Dr. Gordine
The Flicker (1956) - Dr. James Kincaid
The Missing Waveband (1956) - Dr. Maxwell
Jupitron (1956) - Dr. Norstad
Signals from the Moon (1956) - Dr. Edwards
The Ford Television Theatre
The Payoff (1956) - Lieutenant Bernard Shuman
Catch at Straws (1956) - Jed Hartan
Front Page Father (1956) - Malcolm Slade
Miller's Millions (1957) - Judge Patterson
Perry Mason - 
Case of the Runaway Corpse (1957) - Dr. Hoxie
Case of the Prodigal Parent (1958) - Dr. Samuel Anders
Case of the Caretaker's Cat (1959) - Autopsy Surgeon
Case of the Bedeviled Doctor (1959) - Dr. Hoxie
Case of the Lame Canary (1959) - Dr. Hoxie
Case of the Artful Dodger (1959) - Autopsy Surgeon
Case of the Singular Double (1960) - Autopsy Surgeon
Case of the Fickle Fortune (1961) - Autopsy Surgeon
Case of the Wintry Wife (1961) - Autopsy Surgeon
Case of the Duplicate Daughter (1961) - Autopsy Surgeon
Case of the Promoter's Pillbox (1962) - Autopsy Surgeon
Case of the Bogus Books (1962) - Coroner's Physician
Case of the Libellous Locket (1963) - Physician
Case of the Golden Oranges (1963) - Coroner's Physician
Case of the Witless Witness (1963) - Autopsy Surgeon
Case of the Festive Felon (1963) - Surgeon
Wanted: Dead or Alive
Reunion for a Revenge (1959) - The Quaker
The Hostage (1959) - Bartender Tom
Alcoa Theatre
30 Pieces of Silver (1959) - Mr. Hammeker
The Observer (1960) - Father Holze
The Rifleman
Letter of the Law (1959) - Abel
The Trade (1959) - Trager
Miss Millie (1960) - Jim Oxford
The Hangman (1960) - Joe Hannah
Richard Diamond, Private Detective
Marineland Mystery (1959) - Paul Schofield
Coat of Arms (1960)
The Popskull (1960)
The Twilight Zone
Nightmare as a Child (1960) - Doctor
Mr. Dingle, the Strong (1961) - Martian
Sounds and Silences (1964) - Psychiatrist
The Detectives Starring Robert Taylor
The Queen of Craven Point (1961) - Lab Man
The Reason (1961) - Andy
The Untouchables
The Stryker Brothers (1962) - Lieutenant Miller
Death for Sale (1961) - Bradley
The Dick Powell Show
Somebody's Waiting (1961)
The Big Day (1962) - Phil
The Hook (1962)
The Legend (1962) - Attorney
The Old Man and the City (1963)
The Virginian
The Brazen Bell (1962) - Prisoner Guard (uncredited)
No Drums, No Trumpets (1966) - General Howard
The Price of Love (1969) -  Coroner
Gunsmoke
Carter Caper (1963) - Waiter
Wishbone (1966) - Buffalo Hunter
The Raid: Part 1 (1966) - Mr. Simms - Hotel Clerk
Hard Luck Henry (1967) - Jed Walsh
The Big Valley
Forty Rifles (1965) - De Koven
The Iron Box (1966) - MacGowan
 Point and Counterpoint (1969) - Jonathan Williams
Honey West
A Matter of Wife and Death (1965) - Lieutenant Kovacs
Come to Me, My Litigation Baby (1966) - Mr. Strate
Batman
Holy Rat Race (1966) - Leo Gore
Smack in the Middle (1966) - Inspector Basch
Hi Diddle Riddle (1966) - Inspector Basch
Lost in Space
Cave of the Wizards (1967) - Alien on Computer Screen
The Ghost Planet (1966) - Cybernetic Leader/Supreme Brain
Ironside
A Very Cool Hot Car (1967) - Technician
Beyond a Shadow (1969) - Dr. Leonard Marcus
Death by the Numbers (1972) - Dr. Albert Gold
Hogan's Heroes
The Well (1969) - Captain Ritter
It's Dynamite (1970) - Berger
Get Fit or Go Fight (1970) Major Kimmel
Quincy, M.E.
Jury Duty (1981) - Dr. Feld
Cover-Up (1980) - Fire Captain
Mission Impossible
Operation Heart (1967) - 	Dr. Levya
Underwater (1981) - 	Mr. Conners (uncredited)

Singular appearances in television series

The Mickey Rooney Show - Pilot (1954) - Julie's Father
Hopalong Cassidy - Grubstake (1954) - Brock Fain
The Lone Wolf - The Runaway Story  (1954) - Lt. Joe NeeleyCelebrity Playhouse - The Hoax (1955)Warner Brothers Presents - Hand of Fate (1955) - SashaThe Man Behind the Badge - The Case of the Red Letter Day (1955) - StrangerMy Little Margie  - Corpus Delecti (1955) - Roland RobertsCavalcade of America - Monument to a Young Man (1956) - George WooleyTombstone Territory - Desert Survival (1957) - WarrenHighway Patrol - Efficiency Secretary (1957) - Dusty DunnThe Thin Man - Come Back Darling Asta (1957) - Police Lt. HeldonMeet McGraw - The Fighter (1957) - SorrentoUndercurrent - Front Page Father (1957) - Malcolm SladeAlfred Hitchcock Presents - Crackpot (1957) - CarpenterDr. Christian - The Alien (1957) - RauschThe Walter Winchell File - Muggy Night on Times Square: File #39 (1958) - HarrisThe Adventures of Jim Bowie - The Puma (1958) - CaptainAdventures of Superman - The Perils of Superman (1958) - The Lead Masked CriminalHarbor Command  - Four to Die (1958)Man with a Camera - The Bride (1959) - Father EhrlichThe David Niven Show - The Last Room (1959)The Grand Jury - Accident by Appointment (1959)Shotgun Slade - Charcoal Bullet (1960) - Doctor MillerJohnny Ringo - Soft Cargo (1960) - Clint LoganThe DuPont Show with June Allyson - Slip of the Tongue (1960) - HarveyDennis the Menace - Dennis and the Rare Coin (1960) - Hathaway87th Precinct - Lady Killer (1961) - Dr. Ben DanlelaMiami Undercover - The Big Frame (1961) - ChandlerDante - Dial D for Dante (1961) - Joe ConwayEmpire - Long Past, Long Remembered (1962) - Chester ArkinsTarget: The Corruptors! - License to Steal (1962)Follow the Sun - A Choice of Weapons (1962) - Ernie GlazerBreaking Point - And James Was a Very Small Snail (1963)Wagon Train - The Molly Kincaid Story (1963) - Al the BartenderI'm Dickens, He's Fenster - Is There a Doctor in the House? (1963) - Dr. LevyThe Rogues - Hugger-Mugger, by the Sea (1964) - HoganMy Favorite Martian - Who Am I? (1964) - Dr. GilbertThe New Twilight Zone -Examination Day/A Message from Charity  (1985) - Tom CarterKraft Suspense Theatre - Kill No More (1965) Howard LinkVoyage to the Bottom of the Sea - Deadly Invasion (1966) - General HainesFelony Squad - Prologue to Murder (1966) - Dr. KilmerLaredo - The Seventh Day (1967) - BartenderThe Ghost & Mrs. Muir - The Ghost Hunter (1968) - Prof. MaxwellThe Wild Wild West - The Night of the Death-Maker (1968) - GillespieThe Flying Nun - A Fish Story (1968) - OgdenThe Bold Ones: The Senator - The Day the Lion Died (1970) - KellermanThe Governor & J.J. - Charley's Back in Town (1970) - Abel MellonThe Partners - New Faces (1971) - Dr. MitchellThe Mod Squad - And a Little Child Shall Bleed Them (1971) - DoctorThe Doris Day Show - A Fine Romance (1971) - Capt. MalloryThe Bold Ones: The New Doctors - An Inalienable Right to Die (1972) - Carl HedgeThe Rookies - The Good Die Young (1972) - Dr. ParkmanColumbo - Etude in Black (1972) - Dr. BensonTemperatures Rising - Good Luck, Leftkowitz (1972) - GeneralO'Hara, U.S. Treasury - Operation: Dorias (1972) - Dr. JulianChase - The Garbage Man (1973) - FrancoEmergency! - Inheritance Tax (1973) - MarshallShaft - The Killing (1973) - Judge GravesKolchak: The Night Stalker - The Energy Eater (1974) - Frank WesleyLucas Tanner - Cheers (1974) - Dr. WellsThe Rockford Files - Just by Accident (1975) - The AnnouncerGemini Man - Night Train to Dallas (1976) - ConductorCharlie's Angels - Angels in the Wings (1977) - Austin WellsFantasy Island - Seance/Treasure (1979) - Mr. McCloudConcrete Cowboys  - Episode #1.1 (1981) The DeaconBuck Rogers in the 25th Century - Time of the Hawk (1981) - High JudgeVoyagers!  - The Travels of Marco... and Friends (1982) - Isaac WolfsteinTales from The Darkside - Episode #1-17 Madness Room (1983) - The HusbandHunter - Pen Pals (1984) - JudgeDallas - Fools Rush In (1984)Simon & Simon - The Skull of Nostradamus (1985) - Convention OfficialSt. Elsewhere - Tears of a Clown (1985)Knight Rider - Custom Made Killer (1985) - PhilComedy Factory - Man About Town (1986) - Man in MuseumMacGyver - Every Time She Smiles (1986) - Bulgarian OfficerCagney & Lacey - Right to Remain Silent (1987) - Nat WeinreichTV 101 - The Last Temptation of Checker: Part 1 (1989) - Jack GregoryThe Hogan Family - The Franklin Family (1990) - Jerry GrundigBodies of Evidence - Eleven Grains of Sand (1993) - Earl SternER - Blizzard (1994) - Mr. BozinskyNYPD Blue - Torah! Torah! Torah! (1995) - Rabbi Rosenthal (final appearance)

Feature-length filmsWithout Warning! (1952) - Cab co Dispatcher (uncredited)Blackhawk (1952) - Mr. Case / The LeaderLast Train from Bombay (1952) - Capt. TamilVoodoo Tiger (1952) - Karl Werner, aka Heinrich SchultzThe Pathfinder (1952) - Narrator (voice, uncredited)The Magnetic Monster (1953, also dialogue director) - Dr. SernyThe Glass Wall (1953) - Inspector ToomeySerpent of the Nile (1953) - OctaviusSiren of Bagdad (1953) - TelarThe Lost Planet (1953) - Dr. Ernst GroodThe Beast from 20,000 Fathoms (1953, also dialogue director) - ER Doctor
 Run for the Hills (1953) - Phineas CraggSky Commando (1953) - Major ScottThe Great Adventures of Captain Kidd (1953) - Elias Smith (uncredited)Slaves of Babylon (1953) - Narrator (voice, uncredited)Killer Ape (1953) - The Medical Officer (uncredited)Riders to the Stars (1954) - Dr. Klinger (psychiatrist)Charge of the Lancers (1954) - Narrator (voice, uncredited)The Iron Glove (1954) - Opening Narrator (voice, uncredited)Gog (1954, also dialogue director) - Dr. HubertusDown Three Dark Streets (1954) - Paper Plant Superintendent (uncredited)Rogue Cop (1954) - Rudy (uncredited)Naked Alibi (1954) - Round Man (uncredited)Riding with Buffalo Bill (1954) - King CarneyMasterson of Kansas (1954) - Bartender (uncredited)The Silver Chalice (1954) - Slave (uncredited)Conquest of Space (1955) - ElsbachThe Adventures of Captain Africa (1955) - Prime MinisterThe Scarlet Coat (1955) - Major Russell (uncredited)The Big Knife (1955) - Prize Fight Announcer (uncredited)My Sister Eileen (1955) - Shakespearean actor (uncredited)Running Wild (1955) - Delmar GravesCrashout (1955, dialogue director)Cha-Cha-Cha Boom! (1956) - Frank (uncredited)Top Secret Affair (1957) - Reporter LotzieThe Girl in the Kremlin (1957) - Igor SmetkaThe Tijuana Story (1957) - Reuben GalindoPlunder Road (1957, also Asst to Producer) - Smog Officer / NarratorKiss Them for Me (1957) - War Correspondent (uncredited)War of the Satellites (1958) - Jason ibn AkadMachine-Gun Kelly (1958) - Detective ClintonA Nice Little Bank That Should Be Robbed (1958) - Detective (uncredited)Let's Make Love (1960) - Actor auditioning for Clement role (uncredited)The Interns (1962) - Dr. Greenberg (uncredited)Whatever Happened to Baby Jane? (1962) - TV Commercial ManThe Misadventures of Merlin Jones (1964) - Kohner, Lie Detector Operator (uncredited)A Tiger Walks (1964) - Television Interviewer (uncredited)The New Interns (1964) - Dr. Arthur Hellman, PsychiatristBillie (1965) - Ray Case, ReporterAngel's Flight (1965) - Jake the BartenderThe Legend of Lylah Clare (1968) - AnnouncerNow You See It, Now You Don't (1968, TV Movie) - Inspector DelonSeven in Darkness (1969, TV Movie) - The PilotThe Dunwich Horror (1970) - Dr. RaskinBloody Mama (1970) - Dr. RothIf Tomorrow Comes (1971, TV Movie) - JudgeTwo for the Money (1972, TV Movie) - Hospital AdministratorWild in the Sky (1972)The Judge and Jake Wyler (1972, TV Movie) - Doctor SimonThe Longest Yard (1974) - AnnouncerYoung Frankenstein (1974) - Helga's FatherThe Missiles of October (1974, TV Movie) - Soviet MarshalCollision Course: Truman vs. MacArthur (1976, TV Movie) - Admiral ShermanDempsey (1983, TV Movie) - Judge DoolingQuicksilver (1986) - Broker at LunchThe Malibu Bikini Shop (1986) - Uncle DaveOver the Top (1987) - Jim OlsonShe Was Marked for Murder (1988, TV Movie)Skinheads'' (1989) - Saul

References

External links 
 
 

1921 births
1996 deaths
American people of Austrian descent
Male actors from New York (state)
American male television actors
Burials at Westwood Village Memorial Park Cemetery
Deaths from pneumonia in California
People from Yonkers, New York
20th-century American male actors